William J. Spaulding Sr. (1923–1997) was an American World War II veteran, singer and songwriter.

Spaulding was born in Havre, Montana, United States. He wrote and sang "Lets all Skidaddle to Seattle", written for the Seattle World's Fair in 1963, and published on single 45-RPM records.

1923 births
1997 deaths
American military personnel of World War II
American male singer-songwriters
American singer-songwriters
Songwriters from Montana
20th-century American singers
People from Havre, Montana
20th-century American male singers